Massimo Cuttitta (2 September 1966 – 11 April 2021) was an Italian professional rugby union player and coach. He used to play as a prop. He was the twin brother of Marcello Cuttitta.

Early life

Cuttitta was born at Latina. His family moved to South Africa in the late 1960s, where the Cuttitta brothers, including older sibling Michele, started to practise rugby. He attended High School at Pinetown Boys' High School along with his brother.

Club rugby
After the return to Italy, Massimo and Marcello started to play at a more serious level at L'Aquila Rugby. In 1988, they both moved to Amatori Rugby Milano, where Massimo played until 1997. He won four titles of Italian Champion, in 1990/91, 1992/93, 1994/95 and 1995/96, and the Cup of Italy, for 1995. He later went to play for Harlequin F.C., in England, for the season of 1997/98. Returning to Italy, he played for Rugby Calvisano (1999/2000), Rugby Bologna (2000/2001), Rugby Roma Olimpic (2001/2002), Amatori Rugby Alghero (2002/03), Rugby Bologna (2003/04), for a second time, and Rugby Leonessa 1928, that he represented from 2004/05 to 2005/06, being his last team.

International career
Cuttitta made his debut for Italy in 1990 against Poland and went on to gain 69 caps, scoring six tries and captaining the side 22 times. He played at the Rugby World Cup finals, in 1991 and 1995, this time as the captain. He won the title of the FIRA Cup, in 1995/97, winning against France in the final. He played in the first game for Italy in the inaugural Six Nations, in 2000, which his side won 34–20 against Scotland.

Coaching career
He started a coaching career, after ending his playing days, becoming the coach of Amatori Rugby Milano, for 1996/97. In 2004, he took charge of Rugby Leonessa, for the following two seasons, moving then to Edinburgh Rugby, in Scotland. After a season, he moved to L'Aquila Rugby, where he had started his player career. He also worked for six years as scrummaging coach for the Scotland national team.

Death and legacy
Cuttitta died in hospital in Rome on 11 April 2021, having been admitted with symptoms of COVID-19.

In his honour and to celebrate his contributions to rugby in both nations, starting from the 2022 Six Nations Championship the Cuttitta Cup is awarded to the winner of the match between Italy and Scotland.

References

External links
Massimo Cuttitta International Statistics

1966 births
2021 deaths
Italian rugby union players
Italian rugby union coaches
Rugby union props
Rugby Roma Olimpic players
Italy international rugby union players
Italian twins
Twin sportspeople
Deaths from the COVID-19 pandemic in Lazio